These are the NAACP Image Award winners for Outstanding News, Talk or Information - Series, a category that was introduced in 1992 and brought back in 1996 and was reestablished in 1998 until 2003.

Winners and Nominees

Multiple Wins and Nominations

Wins

 3 (BET Tonight with Ed Gordon, The Oprah Winfrey Show)

Nominations

 6 (The Oprah Winfrey Show)
 4 (BET Tonight with Ed Gordon)
 3 (Dateline NBC)
 2 (20/20, 60 Minutes, Biography, Charlie Rose)

See also

 List of American television awards

References

NAACP Image Awards
American television awards